Géza Tóth (21 March 1962 – 18 July 2004) was a Hungarian handball player who played for the club SC Pick Szeged and the Hungarian national team. He participated at the 1988 Summer Olympics, where the Hungarian team placed fourth.

References

1962 births
2004 deaths
Hungarian male handball players
Olympic handball players of Hungary
Handball players at the 1988 Summer Olympics